Azonexus hydrophilus is a gram negative, facultatively aerobic, rod-shaped bacterium from the genus of Azonexus which was isolated from freshwater. Azonexus fungiphilus possesses the nitrogenase-gene .

References

External links
Type strain of Azonexus hydrophilus at BacDive -  the Bacterial Diversity Metadatabase

Rhodocyclaceae
Bacteria described in 2008